Mencius Temple, (former alternate name, Twin Buttes South) is a 7,001 ft major butte, part of the twin buttes of Confucius and Mencius Temples, near the beginning of Western Grand Canyon. Mencius Temple is south of Confucius Temple (0.56 mi), with a long ridge (Supai Group “redbeds”), projecting southwards to the north side of Granite Gorge, on the Colorado River. The buttes are below Point Sublime (~2.0 mi), and borders the west flank of the long Crystal Creek (Arizona) drainage. Tuna Creek (from Point Sublime), draining southwards, borders the west of the twin peaks.

References

Grand Canyon
Landforms of Coconino County, Arizona
Colorado Plateau
Grand Canyon National Park
Mountains of Arizona
Mountains of Coconino County, Arizona
North American 2000 m summits